Johns Branch is a stream in Audrain County in the U.S. state of Missouri. It is a tributary of West Fork Cuivre River.

Johns Branch has the name of one Mr. Johns, an early settler.

See also
List of rivers of Missouri

References

Rivers of Audrain County, Missouri
Rivers of Missouri